The 1999 East Hampshire District Council election took place on 6 May 1999 to elect members of East Hampshire District Council in Hampshire England. The whole council was up for election and the Conservative party gained overall control of the council from the Liberal Democrats.

Election result

One seat was vacant at the time of the election.

References

1999
1999 English local elections
1990s in Hampshire